Freakout/Release is the eighth studio album by English synthpop band Hot Chip. It was released on 19 August 2022 through Domino.

Critical reception

Track listing

Charts

References

External links
 

2022 albums
Domino Recording Company albums
Hot Chip albums